The 2022 4 Hours of Spa-Francorchamps was an endurance sportscar racing event that was held on 25 September 2022, as the fifth round of the 2022 European Le Mans Series.

In LMP2, the race was won by the #22 United Autosports run Oreca 07-Gibson, driven by Tom Gamble, Duncan Tappy and Philip Hanson.

In LMP3, the race was won by the #13 Inter Europol Competition run Ligier JS P320, driven by Charles Crews, Nico Pino and Guilherme Oliveira.

In LMGTE, the race was won by the #57 Kessel Racing run Ferrari 488 GTE Evo, driven by Conrad Grunewald, Frederik Schandorff and Mikkel Jensen.

Qualifying

Qualifying Result 
Pole position in each class are marked in bold.

Race

Race Result 
Class winners are marked in bold. - Cars failing to complete 70% of the winner's distance are marked as Not Classified (NC).

References 

Spa
4 Hours
Spa